Thee Image Club was a music venue located at 18330 Collins Avenue in Miami Beach, Florida. Owned and operated by Marshall Brevetz, the club opened in 1968. Initially called Thee Experience before it moved to a site which had been previously occupied by a 32 lane bowling alley known as the Sunny Isles Bowling Center. The club consisted of a big open ballroom floor with three stages, a meditation room, and black lights. Several famous rock bands and musicians performed at the club in the late 1960s, including The Grateful Dead, The Mothers of Invention, NRBQ, Led Zeppelin, Fantasy, The Jeff Beck Group, The Doors, Canned Heat, Blues Image and Steppenwolf. Tiny Tim also performed there at the height of his popularity. The building was only in operation as a music club for a few years before being closed and demolished. The site is now occupied by Publix Supermarket.

References

Buildings and structures in Miami Beach, Florida
Demolished music venues in the United States